The Millstream Falls (Aboriginal: Yindinji), a tiered plunge waterfall on The Millstream, is located in the UNESCO World Heritagelisted Wet Tropics in the Far North region of Queensland, Australia.

Location and features

The falls are protected within the Millstream Falls National Park. Big Millstream falls are a height of [27.23m] and Little Millstream falls are a height of [15.45m]

The larger of the two falls is reputably the widest single-drop waterfall in Australia.

See also

 List of waterfalls of Queensland

References

External links

  

Waterfalls of Far North Queensland
Tiered waterfalls
Plunge waterfalls